Trichococcus collinsii is a bacterium from the genus Trichococcus.

References

Lactobacillales
Bacteria described in 2002